How Insensitive is  the fourteenth album by American pianist and arranger Duke Pearson featuring performances by Pearson's band augmented by a choir, recorded over three sessions in 1969 and released on the Blue Note label.

Reception
The Allmusic review by Stephen Thomas Erlewine awarded the album 2 stars stating "Each song on How Insensitive boasts extravagant, layered arrangements that flirt with schmaltz, but the voicings and attack are so unusual, the result is a weird variation on easy listening. There is little opportunity for Pearson to showcase his tasteful playing through improvisation, yet the arrangements are so off-kilter, the music never quite works as background music. In other words, it's a very interesting failure and one of the strangest by-products of Blue Note's late-'60s commercialization".

Track listing
All compositions by Duke Pearson except where noted
 "Stella by Starlight" (Ned Washington, Victor Young) - 4:39
 "Clara" (George Gershwin, Dubose Heyward) - 2:43
 "Give Me Your Love" - 3:24
 "Cristo Redentor" - 3:53
 "Little Song" (Jack Manno) - 2:53
 "How Insensitive" (Antônio Carlos Jobim, Vinicius de Moraes, Norman Gimbel) - 2:13
 "Sandalia Dela" (Pearson, Manno) - 3:28
 "My Love Waits (O Meu Amor Espera)" (Pearson, Manno) - 4:35
 "Tears" (Eumir Deodato, Ray Gilbert, Paulo Valle) - 3:29
 "Lamento" (Jobim, de Moraes) - 2:51
Recorded at Rudy Van Gelder Studio, Englewood Cliffs, NJ on April 11 (tracks 1 & 3-5), April 14 (tracks 2, 6 & 8), & May 5 (tracks 7, 9 & 10), 1969

Personnel
Duke Pearson - piano,  electric piano, arranger
Al Gafa - guitar (tracks 1-6 & 8)
Dorio Ferreira - guitar, percussion (tracks 7, 9 & 10)
Bob Cranshaw - bass (tracks 1-6 & 8)
Bebeto Jose Souza - bass (tracks 7, 9 & 10)
Mickey Roker - drums
Airto Moreira - percussion
Andy Bey - lead vocals (track 2), vocals (1, 3-6 & 8)
Flora Purim - lead vocals (tracks 7, 9 & 10)
The New York Group Singers' Big Band - vocals (tracks 1-6 & 8)
Jack Manno - conductor

References

Blue Note Records albums
Duke Pearson albums
1969 albums
Albums recorded at Van Gelder Studio
Albums arranged by Duke Pearson